The 2003 World Table Tennis Championships men's doubles was the 47th edition of the men's doubles championship.

Wang Liqin and Yan Sen won the title after defeating Kong Linghui and Wang Hao in the final by four sets to two.

Finals

References

External links
 Main draw archived from ITTF.
 Players' matches. ITTF.
 WM 2003 Paris (Frankreich). tt-wiki.info (in German).

-